A natural barrier refers to a physical feature that protects or hinders travel through or over.

Mountains, swamps, deserts and ice fields are among the clearest examples of natural barriers. Rivers are a more ambiguous example, as they may obstruct large-scale movement across them (especially by armies) but may facilitate smaller-scale movement along them in boats, once some of the people in the region have developed the relevant technologies. Seas have likewise been an obstacle at first, then a convenient medium for transport along  coastlines, and finally a medium for intercontinental transport.

Natural barriers have been important factors in human history, by obstructing migration and invasion. For example, Jared Diamond argues that West European nations have been the dominant powers of the last 500 years because Europe's many natural barriers divided it into competing nation-states and this competition forced the European nations to encourage innovation and avoid technological stagnation. Natural barriers are similarly important to biogeography.

Some examples of natural barriers are the
 Himalayas
 Grand Canyon 
 Dead Sea
 Mississippi River
 Sierra Madre

References 

Geography terminology